Michael Alexander Rio (born July 6, 1981) is an American mixed martial artist who last competed in 2014. A professional since 2008, he has competed for the UFC and was a competitor on the 15th season of The Ultimate Fighter.

Wrestling career

High school
Rio was introduced to wrestling at Cutler Ridge Middle School, but truly began competing at Miami Southridge High School, where he went on to win two Florida state championships under high school wrestling coach Jim Husk (who also coached his father, uncle, older brother and two younger brothers) and assistant coach Kenny Johnson. During that time he led his school to two undefeated state championship wins, individually amassing an overall record of 147-10, going undefeated his junior and senior years. Along with those honors, he also holds the national record of fastest pin at 4 seconds at 103 lbs.  He was also named to the Wrestling USA Magazine National All-American High School Team as an honorable mention in 2000 and Wrestler of the Year (Mr. Wrestling) by Florida Dairy Farmers, Inc.

It was also in high school that Rio met and began some wrestling training with Cuban world champion and now fellow fighter Alexis Vila.

College
In his first year at the collegiate level, Rio advanced to the finals of the national tournament, but lost.  A year later, he once again advanced to the finals and won his first national championship at the junior college national wrestling championships for Harper College in Illinois at 149 lbs. He then won back-to-back titles at the NAIA national wrestling championships for Lindenwood University in Missouri at 149 and 157 lbs, respectively. He was also the only NAIA wrestler that year to defend his back-to-back title.  Rio finished his college career by being named Most Outstanding Wrestler of the 2006 national championship tournament. And it was because of this performance that he had the honor of being featured in the March 27 issue of Sports Illustrated magazine's long-running segment Faces in the Crowd.

Additionally, during his time at Lindenwood University he was also the college roommate of now fellow UFC fighter and The Ultimate Fighter 12 winner Jonathan Brookins.

Mixed martial arts career

Background
While working as a bouncer at a nightclub, Rio was approached by many former wrestlers asking why he did not fight MMA. After first shunning the idea, he finally gave the sport a try. He began his MMA training at Freestyle Fighting Academy (FFA) in Westchester, Florida, under the tutelage of brothers Marcos and David Avellan.  Initially thinking this would only be a hobby, it wasn't until the ML Management Group CEO offered her management services that his career really began to take off.

Rio is nicknamed "The Wolverine" after the Marvel Comics character for having a similar look. More specifically, the film version played by Hugh Jackman.

Early career and training
Rio's first pro fight came in 2008 when he defeated Marc Seno at Reality Combat Championship 2 with a technical knock out by punches.  Mike continued on his winning streak besting his next five opponents via submissions and knockouts between 2008 and 2011, with one fight ending in a unanimous decision against Mike Bruno. It was also during that time that Rio briefly fought for the former Miami Heat player Glen Rice's G-Force Fights promotion.

Rio formally trained in Miami at gyms Zen Ju-Jitsu with Coach Enrico Cocco, the Health Joint with Ulises Garcia and Young Tigers with Manuel "Manolo" Lopez and Ultimate Fighter alum Alex Caceres.  Rio has also trained at the Jaco Hybrid Training Center in Delray Beach, Florida, best known for their team, the Blackzilians and has traveled to Texas to train with The Ultimate Fighter 16 winner Colton Smith and his boxing coach.

Rio has most recently taken up coaching/training at the American Top Team in Miramar, Florida, and Coconut Creek, Florida.

Championship Fighting Alliance
Rio made his Championship Fighting Alliance (CFA) debut against opponent and former Ultimate Fighter champion Efrain Escudero, but suffered his first loss via decision against the fighter.  Rio rebounded by winning his next two contests, prior to being chosen to participate on The Ultimate Fighter: Live.

The Ultimate Fighter
Having changed formats and being moved to a different network, The Ultimate Fighter 15th season debuted live on cable channel FX March 9, 2012 with rivals Dominick Cruz and Urijah Faber coaching the 32 potential candidates vying for a spot in The Ultimate Fighter house. In the preliminary bout to reach the house, Rio faced Northern Irish fighter, Ali Maclean, and won by submission with a rear-naked choke.  He was then chosen by current UFC bantamweight champion Cruz along with seven other fighters to represent his "Team Cruz" on the show.

After a visit from Ronda Rousey, weeks of heavy training, enduring a minor knee injury, and a scuffle with teammate Justin Lawrence, Rio's name was finally called to face Faber's British fighter Andy Ogle. The fight was even going into the second round, but Rio fell to Ogle via rear-naked choke.

In the last episode before the season finale, it was revealed by UFC President Dana White that all the contestants in the house would fight in the finale except Ogle and Rio due to injuries. The injury to Rio being two broken ribs he suffered during his fight with Ogle.  The injury wasn't immediately noticed after the fight, instead it was discovered in training the following week.  That didn't deter White, however as he was so impressed by the caliber of talent on the show that he decided to sign them all to contracts, Rio included.

Ultimate Fighting Championship
Rio made his official UFC debut when he faced fellow TUF: Live alumnus John Cofer on December 15, 2012, at The Ultimate Fighter: Team Carwin vs. Team Nelson Finale.  He won via submission (armbar) in the third round.

Months later, Rio faced and was defeated by Francisco Trinaldo via arm triangle choke on May 18, 2013, at UFC on FX 8.

Rio then faced The Ultimate Fighter 13 winner Tony Ferguson on October 19, 2013 at UFC 166. He lost via D'arce choke submission in the first round.

Finally, Rio faced Daron Cruickshank on January 25, 2014, at UFC on Fox 10.  He lost the fight when he was stunned due to a wheel kick and finally TKOed by punches at 4:56 of round two.  As a result, Rio was released from the promotion.

Fight Time Promotions
In late March 2014, Rio signed with Olympic gold medalist boxer Howard Davis Jr.'s Fight Time Promotions. In his first ever main event, he went up against former Bellator fighter Avery McPhatter on May 30 at the War Memorial Auditorium in Fort Lauderdale, Florida. He won in the first round via D'Arce choke. He also won submission of the night.

In his second main event, Rio faced former Bellator fighter Frank Carrillo for the Fight Time Lightweight Championship on August 29, 2014. He lost the fight via second round knockout. Carrillo, however, was ineligible to win the title belt for lack of making weight. Rio still took the fight.

Acting career
The Ultimate Fighter wasn't Rio's first taste of television. In 2011, during the fifth season of Miami-based show Burn Notice (eighth episode entitled "Hard Out"), Rio appeared in several scenes in an uncredited mercenary role, even sharing one scene with show star Jeffrey Donovan.

Rio also appeared in a music video in 2012 entitled "The Crown" by Miami hip-hop, funk and soul fusion band Dangerflow. In the video he plays a man fired from his day job and forced to fight in night street fights to earn money for his fictional daughter. "The Crown" was also the official song of the Miami Heat championship parade that same year.

Personal life
Rio's mother and father are of Cuban descent. His mother being born in Miami, his father emigrating to Miami at the age of five. Rio, also born and raised in Miami, participated in many sports with his older brother, including soccer, basketball, baseball, cross country running and wrestling. After his parents divorced and remarried, his family grew and he soon had many siblings, almost all of which also wrestled. After college, Rio returned home and began volunteering coaching at Christopher Columbus High School, where two of his four younger brothers attended and wrestled. Also during that time he began a career in security as a bouncer in Miami's Coconut Grove and downtown Brickell areas and most currently in Miami's South Beach area.

In April 2015, director/producer Danny Segura put together a short documentary film entitled Scraping for a Dollar in which Rio is followed on his daily routine and his attempt to reenter the UFC.

Rio also is a strong advocate of Autism awareness, having a younger brother with the condition. He often volunteers at schools and conventions and has even created a wristband with his name in which he donates all the proceeds to Autism Speaks. It is because of those efforts that he has become one of the South Florida athletic spokesmen for the organization.

Rio and his family are no strangers to fighting having a grandfather and great uncle, Ricardo Montero Duque (who was a major in the Cuban Army and later the US Army), who fought during the Bay of Pigs Invasion against Fidel Castro's forces and for Cuba's independence in the 1950s and 1960s.

Rio is also the cousin of Gaby Sánchez of the Tohoku Rakuten Golden Eagles of Japan's Nippon Professional Baseball (NPB).

On May 17, 2016, Rio and his fiancée welcomed a child, a boy, his first.

Championships and accomplishments

Wrestling
High School
Two-time Florida State Champion, Miami Southridge High School
National record for fastest pin at 103 lbs. (Four seconds)
Wrestling USA Magazine 2000 National All-American Team, Honorable Mention
Florida Dairy Farmers, Inc Wrestler of the Year (Mr. Wrestler)
College
Junior Collegiate National Champion, Harper College
Two-time NAIA National Collegiate Champion, Lindenwood University
Most Outstanding Wrestler, 2006 national tournament
Four-time All-American

Mixed martial arts
Miami New Times - Best of Miami 2013 - Best MMA Fighter
2013 Florida MMA Awards - Florida's Favorite UFC Fighter

Mixed martial arts record

|-
|Loss
|align=center|10–5
|Frank Carrillo
|KO (punches)
|Fight Time 20
|
|align=center|2
|align=center|2:18
|Ft. Lauderdale, Florida, United States
|
|-
|Win
|align=center|10–4
|Avery McPhatter
|Submission (D'Arce choke)
|Fight Time 19: Battle of the Brave
|
|align=center|1
|align=center|2:38
|Ft. Lauderdale, Florida, United States
|
|-
|Loss
|align=center|9–4
|Daron Cruickshank
|TKO (punches)
|UFC on Fox: Henderson vs. Thomson
|
|align=center|2
|align=center|4:56
|Chicago, Illinois, United States
|
|-
| Loss
|align=center| 9–3
|Tony Ferguson
|Submission (D'Arce choke)
|UFC 166
| 
|align=center| 1
|align=center| 1:52
|Houston, Texas, United States
|
|-
| Loss
|align=center| 9–2
|Francisco Trinaldo
|Submission (arm-triangle choke)
|UFC on FX: Belfort vs. Rockhold
| 
|align=center| 1
|align=center| 3:08
|Jaraguá do Sul, Brazil
|
|-
| Win
|align=center| 9–1
|John Cofer
|Submission (armbar)
|The Ultimate Fighter 16 Finale
| 
|align=center| 3
|align=center| 4:11
|Las Vegas, Nevada, United States
|
|-
| Win
|align=center| 8–1
|John Ortolani
|TKO (punches)
|CFA 4: Izquierdo vs. Cenoble
| 
|align=center| 1
|align=center| 4:53
|Miami, Florida, United States
|
|-
| Win
|align=center| 7–1
|Zach Juusola
|TKO (punches)
|CFA 3: Howard vs. Olson
|
|align=center| 1
|align=center| 1:01
|Miami, Florida, United States
|
|-
| Loss
|align=center| 6–1
|Efrain Escudero
|Decision (unanimous)
|CFA 2: McCorkle vs. Befort
|
|align=center| 3
|align=center| 5:00
|Miami, Florida, United States
|
|-
| Win
|align=center| 6–0
|Sylvain Bynum
|TKO (punches)
|MFA: New Generation 4
|
|align=center| 1
|align=center| 0:51
|Miami, Florida, United States
|
|-
| Win
|align=center| 5–0
|Jimmy Chaikong
|Submission (rear-naked choke)
|G-Force Fights: Bad Blood 4
|
|align=center| 1
|align=center| 1:38
|Miami, Florida, United States
|
|-
| Win
|align=center| 4–0
|Mike Bruno
|Decision (unanimous)
|MFA: New Generation 3
|
|align=center| 3
|align=center| 5:00
|Miami, Florida, United States
|
|-
| Win
|align=center| 3–0
|Carlos Galindo
|Submission (choke)
|Fite Nite: Terror En La Villa
|
|align=center| 2
|align=center| 0:59
|San José, Costa Rica
|
|-
| Win
|align=center| 2–0
|Nathaniel Robinson
|Submission (rear-naked choke)
|WWCF: Blood War
|
|align=center| 1
|align=center| 2:45
|Daytona Beach, Florida, United States
|
|-
| Win
|align=center| 1–0
|Marc Seno
|TKO (punches)
|Reality Combat Championship 2: The Second Encounter
|
|align=center| 1
|align=center| 3:09
|Jacksonville, Florida, United States
|

Mixed martial arts exhibition record

| Loss
|align=center| 1–1
| Andy Ogle
| Submission (rear-naked choke)
| The Ultimate Fighter: Live
| 
| align=center| 2
| align=center| 4:19
| Las Vegas, Nevada, United States
| Preliminary round.
|-
| Win
|align=center| 1–0
| Ali Maclean
| Submission (rear-naked choke)
| The Ultimate Fighter: Live
| 
|align=center| 1
| align=center| 3:32
| Las Vegas, Nevada, United States
| 1 round TUF entry fight.

See also
List of male mixed martial artists

References

External links
 Mike Rio website
 
 

1981 births
Living people
American male mixed martial artists
Mixed martial artists from Florida
American mixed martial artists of Cuban descent
Lightweight mixed martial artists
Mixed martial artists utilizing collegiate wrestling
Autism activists
Ultimate Fighting Championship male fighters
American male sport wrestlers